Syrmia Oblast ( or) was one of the oblasts of the Kingdom of Serbs, Croats and Slovenes from 1922 to 1929. Its administrative center was Vukovar.

History
The Kingdom of Serbs, Croats and Slovenes was formed in 1918 and was initially divided into counties and districts (this division was inherited from previous state administrations). In 1922, new administrative units known as oblasts (Serbo-Croatian: oblasti / области) were introduced and the whole country was divided into 33 oblasts. Before 1922, territory of Syrmia Oblast was part of the Syrmia County.

In 1929, 33 oblasts were administratively replaced with 9 banovinas and one district, and territory of Syrmia Oblast was divided between the Danube Banovina, the Drina Banovina, and the Belgrade City Administration.

Geography
The Syrmia Oblast included the entire region of Syrmia. It shared borders with the Bačka Oblast in the north, the Belgrade Oblast in the east, the Valjevo Oblast, the Podrinje Oblast and the Tuzla Oblast in the south, the Vrbas Oblast in the south-west, and the Osijek Oblast in the west.

Demographics
According to 1921 census, all districts (Serbo-Croatian: srezovi / срезови) and administrative cities in the Syrmia Oblast had dominant Serbo-Croatian speaking population. By religion, 7 eastern and central districts (Ilok, Irig, Ruma, Mitrovica, Stara Pazova, Šid, Zemun) were mainly Orthodox, while 3 western districts (Vukovar, Vinkovci, Županja) were mainly Catholic.

Administrative units
Oblast included following districts:
Ilok
Irig
Ruma 
Mitrovica 
Stara Pazova
Šid
Vinkovci 
Vukovar 
Zemun 
Županja

Besides these districts, several cities in the oblast had a separate status:
Mitrovica 
Petrovaradin
Sremski Karlovci
Zemun

Cities and towns
Main cities and towns in the district were:
Inđija 
Ruma 
Mitrovica 
Vinkovci 
Vukovar 
Zemun 

Most of the mentioned cities and towns are today in Serbia, while towns of Vinkovci and Vukovar are today in Croatia.

References

Further reading
Istorijski atlas, Geokarta, Beograd, 1999.
Istorijski atlas, Intersistem kartografija, Beograd, 2010.

See also
Syrmia
Kingdom of Serbs, Croats and Slovenes

External links
Map of the Oblast
Map of the Oblast
Map of the Oblast

 

History of Vukovar
History of Syrmia
Yugoslav Serbia
20th century in Vojvodina
Yugoslav Croatia
History of Slavonia
Oblasts of the Kingdom of Serbs, Croats and Slovenes